Philautus tectus is a species of frog in the family Rhacophoridae.
It is found in Brunei and Malaysia.
Its natural habitat is subtropical or tropical moist lowland forests.
It is threatened by habitat loss.

References

tectus
Amphibians described in 1987
Taxonomy articles created by Polbot